Talladega (also ) is the county seat of Talladega County, Alabama, United States. It was incorporated in 1835. At the 2020 census, the population was 15,861.

The city is home to the Alabama Institute for the Deaf and Blind and the Talladega Municipal Airport, a public general aviation airport. The Talladega Superspeedway, Talladega College and the International Motorsports Hall of Fame are located nearby. The First National Bank of Talladega (now First Bank of Alabama) is the oldest bank in the State of Alabama, being founded in 1848.

Etymology 
The name Talladega is derived from a Muscogee language, a Native American language of the Muscogee. It comes from the word Tvlvtēke, from Muscogee tvlwv, meaning "town", and vtēke, meaning "border", indicating its location on the border between Muscogee and Natchez.

Geography

Talladega is located in east central Alabama at 33° 26′ 5″ N, 86° 6′ 5″ W (33.434722 N, -86.101389 W). Alabama State Routes 21, 77, and 275 are the main routes through the city. AL-77 runs through the downtown area from north to south, leading north 14 mi (23 km) to Lincoln along Interstate 20 and southeast 24 mi (39 km) to Ashland. AL-21 runs from southwest to northeast through the city, leading northeast 23 mi (37 km) to Oxford and southwest 21 mi (34 km) to Sylacauga. AL-275 runs to the north and west of the city as a bypass of the downtown area.

Climate
The climate in this area is characterized by hot, humid summers and generally mild to cool winters.  According to the Köppen Climate Classification system, Talladega has a humid subtropical climate, abbreviated "Cfa" on climate maps.

The data below were accessed via the WRCC. They were compiled over the time period from 1888 to when this chart was created (July 2018).

Talladega's record high of 109 °F (42.8 °C) occurred in September 1925 (Alabama's record high of 112 °F was recorded in Centreville that same month), July 1930, June 1931, and July 1933. The record low of -10 °F (-23.3 °C) occurred in February 1899.

Demographics

2000 census
At the 2000 census, there were 15,143 people in 5,836 households, including 3,962 families, in the city. The racial makeup of the city was 56.15% White, 42.28% Black or African American, 0.18% Native American, 0.30% Asian, 0.02% Pacific Islander, 0.37% from other races, and 0.70% from two or more races. 0.90% of the population were Hispanic or Latino of any race.

Of the 5,836 households 30.0% had children under the age of 18 living with them, 43.7% were married couples living together, 19.7% had a female householder with no husband present, and 32.1% were non-families. 29.5% of households were one person and 13.2% were one person aged 65 or older. The average household size was 2.42 and the average family size was 2.97.

The age distribution was 25.6% under the age of 18, 10.6% from 18 to 24, 25.2% from 25 to 44, 22.8% from 45 to 64, and 15.8% 65 or older. The median age was 37 years. For every 100 females, there were 85.2 males. For every 100 females age 18 and over, there were 79.0 males.

The median household income was $29,617 and the median family income  was $36,296. Males had a median income of $27,951 versus $21,326 for females. The per capita income for the city was $15,733. About 14.1% of families and 19.0% of the population were below the poverty line, including 28.4% of those under age 18 and 17.5% of those age 65 or over.

2010 census
At the 2010 census, there were 15,676 people in 5,719 households, including 3,722 families, in the city. The racial makeup of the city was 48.7% Black or African American, 47.7% White, 0.3% Native American, 0.5% Asian, 0% Pacific Islander, 1.6% from other races, and 1.2% from two or more races. 3.4% of the population were Hispanic or Latino of any race.

Of the 5,719 households 26.6% had children under the age of 18 living with them, 36.0% were married couples living together, 23.9% had a female householder with no husband present, and 34.9% were non-families. 30.9% of households were one person and 12.0% were one person aged 65 or older. The average household size was 2.40 and the average family size was 2.96.

The age distribution was 23.2% under the age of 18, 10.8% from 18 to 24, 25.6% from 25 to 44, 25.9% from 45 to 64, and 14.5% 65 or older. The median age was 37.4 years. For every 100 females, there were 95.0 males. For every 100 females age 18 and over, there were 102.7 males.

The median household income was $32,449 and the median family income  was $38,147. Males had a median income of $31,957 versus $24,209 for females. The per capita income for the city was $15,146. About 22.7% of families and 25.5% of the population were below the poverty line, including 38.8% of those under age 18 and 19.0% of those age 65 or over.

2020 census

As of the 2020 United States census, there were 15,861 people, 5,553 households, and 3,334 families residing in the city.

Landmarks and places of interest
Talladega includes a number of properties listed on the National Register of Historic Places, including the J. L. M. Curry House and Swayne Hall, both listed as National Historic Landmarks. The main listed historic districts are the Silk Stocking District, which includes the Dr. Samuel Welch House, Talladega College Historic District, and Talladega Courthouse Square Historic District. It hosts two NASCAR races annually. In 2020, the Dr. William R. Harvey Museum of Art opened at Talladega College.

Education
Talladega City Schools is the local school district with three elementary schools, one middle school, and one high school in the city. 

Alabama Institute for the Deaf and Blind, the statewide boarding school for the blind and deaf, is in Talladega, being established as a educational institution in 1858.

Talladega also features the historic Talladega College.

Notable people
 Steadham Acker, pioneer aviator
 Tom Bleick, former NFL player, who played college football at Georgia Tech
 The original members of the gospel group The Blind Boys of Alabama met in Talladega at the Alabama School for the Blind
 Sydney J. Bowie, former U.S. Representative and nephew of Franklin Welsh Bowdon
 Taul Bradford, former U.S Representative
 Robert Bradley attended school in Talladega at the Alabama School for the Blind.
 William W. Brandon, Governor of Alabama from 1923–1927
 Charles Brown, actor and member of the Negro Ensemble Company
 Ethlyne Clair, actress
 George Cruikshank, educator, newspaper editor, and historian
 Marcus Henderson Cruikshank, former member of the Confederate States Congress and Mayor of Talladega
 Lee de Forest spent most of his early life in Talladega. 
 Ahmad Gooden, NFL football player
 Tinsley R. Harrison, founding editor of Harrison's Principles of Internal Medicine
 Bob Jenkins, football halfback
 Eddie King, was born in Talladega. He was a blues musician
 Herman H. Long, former president of Talladega College and former president of the United Negro College Fund
 Lamar Looney, Oklahoma state senator
 Felix Grundy McConnell, former U.S. Representative
 Gertrude Michael, film, stage and television actress.
 Jack Nelson, Washington correspondent and bureau chief for the Los Angeles Times, was born in Talladega
 Dixie Parsons, former Major League Baseball player
 Lewis E. Parsons, Governor of Alabama from June to December 1865
 Thomas S. Plowman, former U.S. Representative and Mayor of Talladega
 Dave Pope, former Major League Baseball outfielder
 Tom Ragland, former Major League Baseball second baseman
 George Scales, Negro league baseball player
 Frank Sillmon, former basketball player
 Charles Lynwood Smith, Jr., senior United States federal judge
 Bennie Swain, former basketball player for the Boston Celtics
 W. Aubrey Thomas, U.S. Representative from Ohio
 Robert Smith Vance was born in Talladega in 1931. Federal judge on the United States Court of Appeals for the Eleventh Circuit

Gallery

References

External links

City of Talladega official website
Talladega in the Encyclopedia of Alabama

Cities in Alabama
Cities in Talladega County, Alabama
County seats in Alabama
Alabama placenames of Native American origin